Herdling is a surname. Notable people with the surname include:

Glenn Herdling (born 1964), American comics writer
Kai Herdling (born 1984), German footballer